Richard Stanley Pelpola (21 November 1898 - 19 July 1971) was the Speaker of the Parliament of Ceylon and a member of Parliament in the cabinet of S. W. R. D. Bandaranaike.  He resigned from his position of speaker in 1964 Later in his life he was appointed Sri Lankan High Commissioner to Malaysia. Pelpola died in Kuala Lumpur in 1971. He had fourteen children.

See also
Sri Lankan Non Career Diplomats

External links
 Pelpola, Richard Stanley

References

1898 births
1971 deaths
Speakers of the Parliament of Sri Lanka
Members of the 1st Parliament of Ceylon
Members of the 3rd Parliament of Ceylon
Members of the 4th Parliament of Ceylon
Members of the 5th Parliament of Ceylon
High Commissioners of Sri Lanka to Malaysia
Deputy speakers and chairmen of committees of the Parliament of Sri Lanka
Deputy chairmen of committees of the Parliament of Sri Lanka
Sinhalese politicians